Iran national amateur boxing athletes represents the Islamic Republic of Iran in regional, continental and world tournaments and matches sanctioned by the Amateur International Boxing Association (AIBA).

Olympics
Emmanuel Agassi, father of famous tennis player, Andre Agassi, represented Iran as a boxer in the 1948 and 1952 Summer Olympics.

Asian Games

Asian Championships

Amateur boxing
Boxing in Iran
B